Sanyu is a Ugandan drama television series that premiered on DStv Uganda's Pearl Magic Prime TV on 2 January 2020, at the premier of Multi Choice Uganda's premium network, Pearl Magic Prime. The series stars Catherine Namugenyi in the lead role as Sanyu, including Eleanor Nabwiso and Housen Mushema. Sanyu was nominated for Best TV series and Tracy Kababiito was nominated for Best Actress in a Drama series at the 8th Uganda Film Festival Awards.

Synopsis
Sanyu, an innocent, rural teenage girl that is forced to leave her family and her pursuit for education to do a maid’s job for a complex, wealthy urban family, falls for the young son of her employer and makes her life even harder.

Plot

Season 1 
One of the Kirunda textile factories where Mr. Batte, Sanyu's dad works as a foreman, gets damaged in a fire. Nalweyiso, Sanyu's step-mum, forces her to sign a contract she hasn't read through.This was a contract to work for the Kirundas as a maid. Litle did she know, life with the Kirundas was much more complicated than it appeared. At the Kirundas', Sanyu finds the complicated family that owns Kirunda House of Designs.The youngest son of the family, Oscar Gume falls for her and she reciprocates his feelings although she tries to hide it. She later helps troublesome Melissa, youngest daughter of Linda Kirunda with her outfit that appears on a magazine cover. While the rest of the maids, Karungi, Nanziri & Kakai enjoy Francis Kirunda's company, Sanyu doubts he's a good husband as she had earlier seen him in the company of Patience who Sanyu suspects to be his mistress. This is later proven right when Francis goes to meet Patience in a hotel room who then threatens to expose the truth to the media .To stop this, Francis takes her home which annoys Linda and she fights with Patience causing her to stress out and leads her into drinking. However, Sanyu stops her from consuming alcohol by advising her to draw and take orange juice instead. Patience lies about carrying Francis's baby but Sanyu overhears her talking to a doctor to forge scans. Later, Oscar sees Sanyu's designs which are amazing and suggests they are used in Kirunda house of designs. Later, Sanyu encounters Oscar's fiancée Kirabo who, out of insecurity, instantly hates her and yet her brother Pius falls for her. Kirabo later leaves Oscar at the altar and runs with business tycoon, Steve. Meanwhile, the eldest son of the house, Patrick together with his wife Lucy attempt to steal Linda's assets but are unsuccessful. Sanyu and Linda partner and create designs preparing for a fashion show. Lucy, with maid Karungi's help steals designs from Linda and makes the exact same clothes and signs up to compete in the show.He models go first and she is alter devastated when Linda's models are wearing completely different designs made by Sanyu hence Linda wins.But as the police arrest Lucy for theft, she accuses Sanyu of giving the designs to her causing her imprisonment when none not even Linda believes her.She loses her job and meets her friend ,Atwine who started out as an enemy but after Sanyu saves her, they become good friends.Sanyu gets bailed out by her dad and she alter gets a job at Lightning company of designs where her boss,George falls for her and her designs.George is Oscar's cousin.Later, Patrick starts drug abuse due to stress from Lucy and Lucy desperately wants a child yet she bears curses of her abandoned child Kule.In an attempt to prove her innocence to the Kirundas about the theft ,Sanyu gets two identities Sanyu & Sasha whereby Sanyu is George's assistant and Sasha is Oscar's assistant.

Season2  
When Sasha helps Melissa with her problem of Pius through sending Atwine and her gang to attack him,she leaves her bracelet at the crime scene which is similar to Sanyu’s and later Pius notices it on Sanyu’s hand and in a fit of rage he accidentally pulls off her wig And then  Sasha is found out to be Sanyu by Pius who Sanyu bangs on the head leading to his memory loss.Kirabo then sees Sasha without her wig and exposes her in front  of the Kirundas as Sanyu.However other than surprised George is instead amazed at the fact that she could run two different companies at the same time .George keeps Sanyu's job and she starts living with her workmate and friend,Anita.However,on the due date they are supposed to clear their rental fees,burglars attack them and steal the money forcing the landlady to kick her and Anita out of the house.Patience,Kirunda's former mistress comes forth with a deal for George to help Adeyinka  illegally export precious stones by putting them on clothes.Meanwhile,troublesome Mellissa gets drunk and hurts her eye as she returns home.Sanyu starts spending the night in the office to which George is furious when he finds out and he takes her to his apartment for a shelter.However,when Oscar sees her there he comes to conclusions that she is sleeping with George and in a fit of rage to turn George bad in front of Mr.Batte,the latter instead asks Sanyu to marry George as she is already carrying his "child." At first , Sanyu is reluctant at this but she later agrees but on the due date of their "kwanjula"(introduction ceremony) two things happen: Adeyinka's consignment is stolen by robbers and  George disappears and everyone concludes Oscar has a hand in his disappearance.

Cast

Tracy Kababito - Sanyu (Sn1)
Catherine Namugenyi - Sanyu (Sn2 onwards)
Allan Kutos Katongole - Oscar Gume
Racheal Nduhukire - Melissa
Marion Asilo Dorothy - Linda Mutesi Kirunda
Abby Mukiibi Nkaaga - Mr Kirunda
Housen Mushema - Patrick Nkemba 
Eleanor Nabwiso - Lucy Nkemba
Mutumba Jenkins - Ddembe
Allen Musumba - Nakakande
Deedan Muyira - Atwine
Sharon O Nalukenge - Kirabo 
Ethan Kavuma - George 
Timothy Lwanga
Timothy Kibirango
Leila Kalanzi Kachapizo - Abimala

Episodes

Series overview

References

External links
 Sanyu - Trailer
 

Ugandan drama television series
Pearl Magic original programming